Don Drumm may refer to:

 Don Drumm (American football) (1887–1968), American football player and coach
 Don Drumm (sculptor) (born 1935), American sculptor, designer and master craftsman
 Don Drumm (singer), American country music singer